Visidela (The Fishing Net) is a 1997 Sri Lankan Sinhala drama romance film directed by H. D. Premaratne and produced by Soma Edirisinghe for EAP Films. It stars W. Jayasiri and Anusha Sonali in lead roles along with Jackson Anthony and Daya Thennakoon. Music composed by Rohana Weerasinghe. It is the 887th Sri Lankan film in the Sinhala cinema.

Plot

Cast
 W. Jayasiri as Gunapala 
 Anusha Sonali as Sirima
 Jackson Anthony as Nimal
 Daya Thennakoon as Piyadasa, Nimal's father
 Daya Alwis as Keerala
 Grace Ariyawimal as Emilyn, Gunapala's wife
 Robin Fernando as Loku IC Mahathaya
 Razi Anwar as Gamini
 Mahendra Perera as Conductor Sumith
 Ramani Siriwardena as Achala, Inspector's daughter
 Vasanthi Chathurani as Saroja, Inspector's daughter
 Anjela Seneviratne as Inspector's wife
 Pradeep Senanayake as Saroja's friend
 Gnananga Gunawardena as Seargent Somapala

Soundtrack

References

1997 films
1990s Sinhala-language films
1997 romantic drama films
Sri Lankan romantic drama films